My Girlfriend is a 2019 Chinese romantic drama based on the novel of the same name by Wei Xiaobao, starring Xu Weizhou and Qiao Xin. The series airs on Youku from October 8, 2019.

Synopsis
When Ding Xiaorou was 15 years old, some accidental misunderstanding had her believe that she would never find true love in her life. Until she met Chi Xin. Things happened and two young hearts got gradually drawn to each other.

Cast

Main

Supporting

Production
The series began filming in April 2018 in Suzhou, and wrapped up in June 2018.

Awards and nominations

References 

Chinese romantic comedy television series
2019 web series debuts
2019 Chinese television series debuts
2019 Chinese television series endings
Youku original programming